Jack J. Volrich (February 27, 1928 – May 31, 2010) was born in Anyox, British Columbia and was the 33rd mayor of Vancouver, British Columbia, Canada from 1977 to 1980. Prior to this, he practised law and served as an alderman on the Vancouver City Council.

He started his political career with the municipal political party, TEAM. However, he left TEAM during his first term as mayor and ran successfully as an independent in the 1978 election.  He was defeated in 1980 by Michael Harcourt. Important issues during Volrich's tenure as mayor included the proposed construction of a trade and convention centre and the debate over the ward system method of electing aldermen to city council.

Volrich resumed practising law, but returned to the political world when he ran unsuccessfully as a Progressive Conservative Party candidate for Parliament in the electoral district of Vancouver East in the 1984 election. In 1992–1993, he was an organizer for and supporter of David Varty, a candidate for the federal Liberal Party nomination in the electoral district of Vancouver Centre.

References

1928 births
2010 deaths
Candidates in the 1984 Canadian federal election
Deaths from kidney failure
Mayors of Vancouver
People from the Regional District of Kitimat–Stikine
Progressive Conservative Party of Canada candidates for the Canadian House of Commons
20th-century Canadian politicians